Yanko Stoyanov (1913–1946) was a Bulgarian footballer who played as a midfielder.

Club career
Stoyanov joined Levski Sofia from Botev Sofia in 1935. He was the top scorer in the 1939–40 Bulgarian National Football Division with 14 goals.

International career
On 22 October 1939, Stoyanov made his debut for Bulgaria, starting in a 2–1 loss against Germany, before being substituted at half-time. On 6 June 1940, on his second and final appearance for Bulgaria, Stoyanov scored the opening goal in a 4–1 loss against Slovakia.

International goals
Scores and results list Bulgaria's goal tally first.

References

1913 births
1946 deaths
Footballers from Sofia
Bulgarian footballers
Association football midfielders
First Professional Football League (Bulgaria) players
Bulgaria international footballers
PFC Levski Sofia players